Joe Erskine may refer to:
Joe Erskine (Welsh boxer) (1934–1990), former British and British Empire heavyweight boxing champion
Joe Erskine (American boxer) (1930–2009), former welterweight boxer and long-distance runner